Rancho Texicano: The Very Best of ZZ Top is a greatest hits album by the rock band ZZ Top. It was released in 2004 on Rhino Entertainment. The title is a portmanteau of "texan" and "mexicano", meaning "Tex-mex Ranch". The 2-CD compilation is essentially a pared-down version of the 4-CD box set Chrome, Smoke & BBQ, released the previous year. All songs are original mixes that have been digitally remastered.

Track listing
All tracks are written by Billy Gibbons, Dusty Hill and Frank Beard, except where noted.

Personnel
Billy Gibbons - guitar, vocals
Dusty Hill - bass, keyboards, backing vocals, lead vocals on "Goin' Down to Mexico", "Tush", and "Viva Las Vegas", co-lead vocals on "Beer Drinkers and Hell Raisers", "Heard It on the X", and "It's Only Love"
Frank Beard - drums, percussion

Charts
Album - Billboard (United States)

Certifications

References

2004 greatest hits albums
ZZ Top compilation albums
Rhino Records compilation albums
Albums produced by Bill Ham